Sigrid Sophia Agatha de Torres von Giese, better known by her screen name Paraluman (December 14, 1923 – April 27, 2009), was an award-winning Filipina German actress. Her contemporaries include the likes of Fernando Poe, Sr. and Carmen Rosales. She was a major contract star of Sampaguita Pictures.

Personal life
Paraluman was born in Tayabas to Lothar von Giese, and Tecla de Torres, who was herself from Tayabas. Educated at Assumption College, the young Paraluman herself was an avid movie fan. She loved reading magazines about her favorite celebrities. Her interest in showbiz increased when she learnt that their next-door neighbour was the actress Corazón Noble, and she would often climb their fence to catch glimpse of the actress. Her curiosity yielded positive results because Noble's younger sister, Lily, noticed her and they soon became friends.

Career
Her extraordinary beauty led the seventeen-year-old Paraluman to be recommended by another sister of Corazón Noble, Norma, to film producer Luis Nolasco. Her first movie was Flores de Mayo (1940), and she initially used the screen name Mina de Gracía. She was rechristened "Paraluman" (archaic Tagalog for "muse" or "magnetic needle") by Fernando Poe, Sr., who signed her as a full-fledged star in X’otic Films' Paraluman (1941). This was followed by the actresses' roles in the films Bayani ng Bayan and Puting Dambana.

After World War II, she came back to cinema as a contract star of Sampaguita Pictures. She then became a famous leading lady in romantic movies, but when she made a comeback, her image was repackaged by Sampaguita Pictures owner Dr. José "Doc" Pérez. She was given character roles, playing nemesis to Gloria Romero in Hongkong Holiday, then as a disabled woman in Tanikaláng Apoy (1959). She won a FAMAS Best Actress Award for her role in Sino ang Maysala?

Paraluman was also nominated by FAMAS four times: twice in 1959 for Best Actress for the movies Bobby and Anino ni Bathala, in 1972 as Best Supporting Actress for Lilet, and in 1976 as Best Supporting Actress for Mister Mo, Lover Boy Ko. Her last films were Viva Films' Kailan Sasabihing Mahal Kita in 1985 and  NV Productions' "Tatlong Ina, isang Anak" in 1987 as one of the spinster aunts of Miguel Rodríguez.

Family
Paraluman had her first marriage to Yoshifume Abe that ended in divorce. She remarried in December 1949 in Manila to airline pilot Anthony Joseph "Tony" Barretto O'Brien, who was the son of Peter O'Brien and Dolores Barretto y Barretto of Zambales. Baby O'Brien, who was her daughter by her first marriage to Abe, took on the surname of her stepfather and was herself a television actress and commercial model. O'Brien's daughter Rina Reyes is also an actress.

Death
Paraluman died of cardiac arrest on 27 April 2009 at her home in Parañaque. She was 85 years old.

In popular culture
Filipino rock band The Eraserheads mentioned her in the opening lyrics of Ang Huling El Bimbo.
Paraluman is also mentioned in the lyrics of the song Binibini by Filipino pop group The Rainmakers.
A Filipino rock band, Paraluman, is also named after the late actress.

Selected filmography

 Paraluman (1947)
 Puting dambana (1941)
 Palaris (1941)
 Manilena (1941)
 Bayani ng buhay (1941)
 Paloma, La (1947)
 Ina (1947)
 Awit ng bulag (1948)
 Pinaghating isangdaan (1949)
 Kaputol ng isang awit (1949)
 Good Morning Professor (1949)
 Biro ng tadhana (1949)
 Dalawang bandila (1950)
 Batong buhay (1950)
 May karapatang isilang (1953)
 Highway 54 (1953)
 Pusong ginto (1954)
 Now and Forever (1954)
 Rodora (1956)
 Gigolo (1956)
 Babalu (1956)
 Lydia (1956)
 Veronica (1957)
 Sonata (1957)
 Sino ang maysala (1957)
 Hongkong Holiday (1957)
 Taga sa bato (1957)
 Ulilang angel (1958)
 Elephant Girl (1958)
 Bobby (1958)
 Anino ni Bathala (1958)
 Pitong pagsisisi (1959)
 Ipinagbili ko ang aking anak (1959)
 Tanikalang apoy (1959)
 Kahapon lamang (1959)
 Surrender - Hell! a.k.a. "Blackburn's Guerrillas" (1959)
 Baby Face (1959)
 Kamandag (1959)
 Kuwintas ng alaala (1960)
 Isinakdal ko ang aking ama (1960)
 Amy, Susie & Tessie (1960)
 Estela Mondragon (1960)
 Makasalanang daigdig (1961)
 Dalawang kalbaryo ni Dr. Mendez (1961)
 Apat na yugto ng buhay (1961)
 Pitong kabanalan ng isang makasalanan (1962)
 Ako ang katarungan (1962)
 Class reunion, Ang (1963)
 Moro Witch Doctor (1964)
 Isinulat sa dugo (1965)
 Tao ay makasalanan, Ang (1966)
 Bakit pa ako isinilang? (1966)
 Dahil Sa Isang Bulaklak (1967)
 Surabaya Conspiracy (1969)
 Nam's Angels (1970)
 Lilet (1971)
 Daughters of Satan (1972)
 Super Gee (1973)
 Mister Mo, Lover Boy Ko (1975)
 Alat (1975)
 Ikaw... ako laban sa mundo! (1976)
 Bakit may pag-ibig pa? (1979)
 Kailan sasabihing mahal kita (1985)

References

External links

1923 births
2009 deaths
20th-century Filipino actresses
Filipino child actresses
Filipino film actresses
Filipino people of German descent
People from Tayabas
Actresses from Quezon